This is a list of mayors of the city of Pekin, Illinois.

Mayors of City of Pekin

References 

Pekin, Illinois, USA
Mayors
 
1829 establishments in Illinois